Better Than Heavy is the debut and only studio album from supergroup Mongrel. It was released on 7 March 2009.

Track listing
Disc 1

Disc 2

Personnel
Credits adapted from Better Than Heavy liner notes.

Mongrel
 Jon McClure - vocals
Kareem Dennis - vocals
 Drew McConnell - guitar, bass guitar
 Andy Nicholson - guitar, bass guitar, synthesizer
 Joe Moskow - effects, guitar, piano, strings, synthesizer, trumpet, melodica
 Matt Helders - drums

Additional personnel
 Brother Culture - vocals
 Samia Farah - vocals
 DJ Moodie - scratches
  Dave Fullwood - trumpet
 Chris Petter - trombone 
 Johnny Fielding - violin 
 Crocodile - effects, sampler
 Bassekou Kouyate - ngoni
 Skip McDonald - guitar

Production
 Mongrel - production
 Anthony Lueng - additional mixing
 Adrian Sherwood - mixing, production

References

2009 albums
Mongrel (band) albums